M.V. Heroic Ace is a PCTC (Pure car and truck carrier) owned by M.O.L (Mitsui O.S.K. Lines), one of the three largest car carrier companies in the world. With a capacity of 6,400 RT 43 cars, it belongs to a class of car carriers that include the largest car carriers in the world.

She was built in 2003 at the Minami Nippon shipyard in the Inland Sea, Japan, as part of a series of 12 large car carriers. Her sister ships include Courageous Ace and Splendid Ace (built at Minami Nippon), Martorell, Progress Ace and Prominent Ace (built at Shin Kurushima yard), and Liberty Ace, Utopia Ace, Paradise Ace and Freedom Ace (built at M.H.I Kobe).

The vessel's bows and superstructure were specially designed with additional rounding off to enable them to navigate at higher speeds.

Ship's Particulars

The vessel is fitted with a large stern ramp, and two side midship ramps. The stern ramp is located on number 7 car deck. The midship ramps are capable of being lifted up to reach number 6 car deck, and hence can service both numbers 6 and 7 car decks.

M.V. (Motor Vessel) Heroic Ace has 13 car decks, including movable decks. The decks are moved using a hydraulic deck lifter which is part of the ship's equipment and operated by the ships officers. The vessel plies on a worldwide route, and has traded in North America, Europe, Asia and Africa.

As of  2011, the ship was managed by Wilhelmsen ship management - earlier called Barber ship management. The ship's officers belonged to India, Bangladesh and Sri Lanka, the ship's crew was Indian.

Gallery

References

Merchant ships of Japan
2003 ships
Ships built in Japan
Ro-ro ships